Neminaka (also Nemounaka) is a village in the commune of Nyambaka in the Adamawa Region of Cameroon, on the road from Ngaoundéré to Meiganga.

Population 
In 1967, Neminaka contained 141 inhabitants, mostly Mboum. At the time of the 2005 census, there were 694 people in the village.

References

Bibliography 
 Jean Boutrais (ed.), Peuples et cultures de l'Adamaoua (Cameroun) : actes du colloque de Ngaoundéré, du 14 au 16 janvier 1992, ORSTOM, Paris ; Ngaoundéré-Anthropos, 1993, 316 p. 
 Dictionnaire des villages de l'Adamaoua, ONAREST, Yaoundé, October 1974, 133 p.

External links 

 Nyambaka, on the website Communes et villes unies du Cameroun (CVUC)

Populated places in Adamawa Region